Gospel Hill is a 2008 American independent drama film directed and produced by Giancarlo Esposito (in his directorial debut) and written by Jeff Stacy, Jeffrey Pratt Gordon, and Terrell Tannen. Esposito also stars alongside Adam Baldwin, Angela Bassett, Tom Bower, Danny Glover, Taylor Kitsch, Nia Long, RZA, and Julia Stiles. The film premiered at the Woodstock Film Festival on October 3, 2008, was released on DVD in the United States on February 10, 2009.

Plot
Gospel Hill tells the intersecting story of two men in the fictional South Carolina town of Julia. Danny Glover plays John Malcolm, the son of a slain civil rights activist Paul Malcolm (Samuel L. Jackson).  Jack Herrod (Tom Bower) is the white former sheriff who never officially solved the murder.  Their paths begin to cross when a development corporation comes to town with plans to raze Julia's historic African-American community of Gospel Hill, now fallen into disrepair, to build a golf course.  John Malcolm's wife Sarah (Angela Bassett), a schoolteacher, seems alone in her opposition to the project, which is being endorsed by Gospel Hill's prominent African-American physician, Dr. Palmer (Esposito).  Meanwhile, a young white teacher (Julia Stiles) comes to town and falls for a handsome young landscaper (Taylor Kitsch), whose business is booming thanks to Dr. Palmer's patronage.

Cast
 Adam Baldwin as Carl Herrod
 Angela Bassett as Sarah Malcolm
 Tom Bower as Jack Herrod
 Julia Stiles as Rosie
 Chris Ellis as L. Don Murray
 Giancarlo Esposito as Dr. Palmer
 Danny Glover as John Malcolm
 Samuel L. Jackson as Paul Malcolm (uncredited)
 Taylor Kitsch as Joel Herrod
 RZA as Lonnie (as The RZA)
 Nia Long as Mrs. Yvonne Palmer

References

External links
 

2008 films
2008 directorial debut films
2008 drama films
2008 independent films
2000s English-language films
African-American drama films
African-American films
American independent films
Films scored by Scott Bomar
Films set in South Carolina
Films shot in South Carolina
2000s American films